Ardisia crispa, the Japanese holly, is a species of flowering plant in the family Primulaceae. It is found in the eastern Himalayas, Assam, southern China, Indochina, Taiwan, Korea, the Ryukyu Islands, and Japan, and has been introduced to Queensland, Australia, and the Windward Islands in the Caribbean. An evergreen perennial shrub reaching at most , it is often sold as an ornamental for its dark green leaves and longlasting red berries, much like Ardisia crenata, the Christmas berry or coralberry.

References

crispa
Flora of East Himalaya
Flora of Assam (region)
Flora of South-Central China
Flora of Southeast China
Flora of Laos
Flora of Cambodia
Flora of Vietnam
Flora of Eastern Asia
Plants described in 1834